The Shipment is a 2001 film about a mob enforcer who is hired to recover a shipment of Viagra gone awry. Directed by Alex Wright, it stars Matthew Modine, Elizabeth Berkley, Nicholas Turturro, and Robert Loggia.

Cast

Main cast
 Matthew Modine as Mitch Garrett
 Elizabeth Berkley as Candy Colucci
 Nicholas Turturro as Eddie Colucci
 Robert Loggia as Frank Colucci
 Joseph Cortese as Vincent Florio
 Paul Rodriguez as Jose Garcia
 Garry Chalk as Dale Dixer
 Philip Granger as Jack

Supporting cast
 Rob deLeeuw as Danny (Credited as Robert deLeeuw)
 G. Michael Gray as Lester Tritt
 Steve Bacic as Jimmy
 Rob Daly as Luis
 Michael Sicoly as Mike
 Craig Veroni as Pancho
 Jay Brazeau as Marty
 Michael Roberds as Bubba
 Wren Roberts as Cowboy Pete (Credited as Wren Robertz)
 Carmen Aguirre as Mexican Hooker #1
 Alexandra Castillo as Mexican Hooker #2 (Credited as Alex Castillo)
 Colin Naples as Small Mexican Cop
 Karen Robertson as Bikini Girl #1
 Laura Hargreaves as Bikini Girl #2

External links

2001 films
2001 comedy films
2000s English-language films
Canadian comedy films
English-language Canadian films